Khevsureti (Georgian: ხევსურეთი, a land of valleys) is a historical-ethnographic region in eastern Georgia. They are the branch of Kartvelian (Georgian) people located along both the northern (Pirikita khevsureti, Georgian: პირიქითა ხევსურეთი) and southern (Piraketa khevsureti, Georgian: პირაქეთა ხევსურეთი)  slopes of the Great Caucasus Mountains.

Geography
Comprising the small river valleys of the Migmakhevi, Shatili, Arkhoti and the Aragvi, the province borders with Ingushetia and Chechnya and is included in the present-day Dusheti Municipality, Mtskheta-Mtianeti region. Khevsureti, with the area of approximately 405.3 square miles (1050 km²), is traversed by the main crest of the Greater Caucasus Range, dividing the province in two unequal parts. Pirikita Khevsureti ("thither") is a larger one, with the area of c. 565 km², while Piraketa Khevsureti ("hither") occupies 428 km². The largest villages are Barisakho and Shatili.

Ethnography
 
The territory of Khevsureti, together with the neighboring area of Pshavi, was known to medieval writers under the joint designation Pkhovi or in the Georgian language: ფხოვი. Chronicler Leonti Mroveli mentions that after the conversion of the King Mirian III of Iberia and the Queen Nana into Christianity in the early 4th century, St. Nino continued to preach among Georgian highlanders (მთიულნი, mtiulni) including Pkhovi.

Medieval Georgia was never able to establish a typical feudal system. The civil code of the community remained based on the ancient traditions and values. Children of the noble families and lords were brought up by the families of peasants (გლეხი, glekhi) who were known for their wisdom and human qualities. These people introduced youth to their culture, history, traditions and all aspects of human knowledge and experiences based on Christian Orthodox values. (See Georgian Orthodox and Apostolic Church)

Historically, Georgian highlander communities enjoyed a degree of autonomy. Khevsurs never accepted local lords; they elected their leaders or Khevisberi (ხევისბერი, elder) and council of elders and submitted themselves only to the monarch (see List of the Kings of Georgia). They were exceptional warriors with traditional Georgian qualities of courage, openness and honesty, fraternity, independence and love of freedom, who were often promoted as royal bodyguards. Kings regarded them as reliable guardians of the Caucasus Mountains and the northern border of the kingdom. In the battles Khevsurs wore flags adorned with crosses and considered themselves permanent members of the army of the sacred flags and guardians of Georgian Kings.

A story first popularized by Russian serviceman and ethnographer Arnold Zisserman, who spent 25 years (1842–67) during Russian expansion in the Caucasus (see Georgia within the Russian Empire), suggests that these Georgian highlanders were descendants of the last European Crusaders. He claimed that their folk culture – the material, social, and religious practices – resembled those of the Crusaders. Although Zisserman claims to have arrived at the speculation himself and is often credited with the idea, this theory appears in earlier sources and was a popular story among non-Georgians in Tbilisi. The claim that any historical evidence indicates that Khevsurs may have descended from crusaders has been thoroughly discredited, and Georgian scholars have universally derided the story.

Zisserman also writes that 'concerning their origin the Khevsurs have preserved a tradition: they consider a certain man by the name of Gudaneli as their first ancestor. He was a peasant vassal of a landlord in Kakheti, and to escape punishment for some crime which he had committed, he found refuge in the Pshav village of Apsho. From his two sons, Arabuli and Chinchara, originated the family of Arabuli, consisting of 320 homes, and the family of Chincharauli, with 210 homes.' American traveler Richard Halliburton (1900–1939) saw and recorded the customs of the Khevsur tribe in 1935.

The Khevsur men, dressed in chain mail and armed with broadswords, wore garments full of decoration made up of crosses and icons, which served as a means of protection according to Christianity which Georgia adopted early in 4th century. Greek historian Herodotus ( –  BC) notes that the Caucasian highlanders of that time, were brilliant knitters and embroiders of their dress or Chokha, which wore out but never faded from frequent usage. Young girls started knitting at the age of 6-7, but men studying and military training, because according to their tradition women were deprived from education and higher social status. They had a strict system of physical training in martial arts preserved as a Khridoli martial art, and which is a part of the rich Georgian military tradition.

Khevsur dances also preserved in the national dances as a warrior dance Khevsuruli.

Religion

Their religion is a unique mixture of Georgian Orthodox Christianity and pre-Christian cults. They worship sacred places locally known as jvari (“cross’), khati (“icon”) or salotsavi (“sanctuary”). Aside from their religious character, these were the sites where the locals discussed and decided common matters such as raids against enemies, peace-making, appeals of various characters, etc. Even during the Soviet period, with its harsh restrictions against any religious activities, each year the Georgian highlanders gathered with a group of elder priests and performed their traditional rituals.

Historical population figures
As of the 1873 census, Khevsureti had the population of 4,872. By 1926, the population shrank to 3,885.

Figures from the Russian imperial census of 1873 given in Dr. Gustav Radde's Die Chews'uren und ihr Land — ein monographischer Versuch untersucht im Sommer 1876 (published by Cassel in 1878) divide the villages of Khevsureti into eight communities:

 the Barisakho community: 16 villages, 298 households, consisting of 723 men and 718 women, totalling 1,441 souls
 the Guli community: 8 villages, 162 households, consisting of 335 men and 356 women, totalling 691 souls
 the Roshka community: 7 villages, 145 households, consisting of 335 men and 315 women, totalling 648 souls
 the Batsaligo community: 9 villages, 131 households, consisting of 296 men and 288 women, totalling 584 souls
 the Akhieli community: 5 villages, 111 households, consisting of 273 men and 240 women, totalling 513 souls
 the Shatili community: 5 villages, 121 households, consisting of 252 men and 272 women, totalling 524 souls
 the Ardoti community: 3 villages, 86 households, consisting of 198 men and 249 women, totalling 447 souls
 the Tolaant-Sopeli community: 8 villages, 197 households, consisting of 555 men and 593 women, totalling 1,148 souls

1873 TOTAL: 61 villages, 1,251 households, consisting of 2,967 men and 3,029 women, in all 5,996 souls.

These figures can be compared with those given in Sergi Makalatia's Khevsureti (Komunistis Stamba, Tbilisi: 1935; in Georgian):

 the Barisakho community: 14 villages, 241 households, consisting of 467 men and 539 women, totalling 1,006 souls
 the Batsaligo community: 19 villages, 291 households, consisting of 547 men and 639 women, totalling 1,186 souls
 the Shatili community: 12 villages, 233 households, consisting of 528 men and 572 women, totalling 1,100 souls
 the Arkhoti (Akhieli) community: 3 villages, 78 households, consisting of 123 men and 133 women, totalling 256 souls

1935(?) TOTAL: 43 villages, 769 households, consisting of 1,492 men and 1,668 women, in all 3,160 souls.

There are, of course, many reasons for which a comparison of these two censuses would be a tricky and to some extent pointless exercise. For what it is worth, however, such a comparison does confirm a process of rural exodus during the late nineteenth and early twentieth centuries whereby the Khevsurs seem to have abandoned isolated or higher-altitude settlements and moved down-valley to live in villages benefiting from more clement climatic conditions (or perhaps even to live in towns further afield).

Although these figures must of course be taken with a pinch of salt (in the sense that they are based upon data whose reliability is unproven and debatable to say the least), a comparison between the two years (1873 and 1935) reveals
 a 14 per cent drop in the average number of men per household;
 an 8 per cent drop in the average number of women per household;
 an 8 per cent drop in the average number of households (families) per village;
 a 19 per cent drop in the average number of inhabitants per village; and
 a 35 per cent decrease in the region's total population (with more isolated regions losing more inhabitants e.g. the Shatili community 42% and the Akhieli community 50% than the others lower down the valleys).

Migration
Some disobedience offered by the Khevsurs to the Soviet ideology was a reason for obligatory migration to the plain initiated by the government in 1951. As a result, many high-mountainous villages were deserted. Economic hardship of the last two decades also increased a tendency towards migration.

Traditions

Like other mountainous areas of Georgia, Khevsureti is characterized by a great diversity of traditions and customs. Khevsurs speak a local dialect of the Georgian language that resembles the literary Georgian of the Middle Ages and retain many of their ancient traditions including elements of folk ritual. The institution of the Blood feud was still alive in the twentieth century.

Khevsur music also resembles that of Georgia in the Middle Ages. Khevsureti is famous for its Medieval ballads and folk music.

The traditional costume of Khevsureti includes a male upper garment called the Perangi. While this bears some resemblance to the classic Georgian Chokha, it is shorter and trapezoidal in shape and features a more powerful color balance and a greater use of cruciform decorative motifs.

The architecture of Khevsureti is mostly highly fortified  and defensive in character, featuring a profusion of towers clinging to the mountainsides, signifying constant vigilance in the face of enemy attack. The Khevsurs were renowned for their warfare with the (mostly Muslim) peoples of the Northern Caucasus including the Chechens, the Kists, and the many peoples of Dagestan. Due to the geographic, ethnic and religious complexity and lack of industrialization in the Greater Caucasus, it was a common occurrence for the tribes of the North Caucasus to attack and rob mountain-dwelling Georgians. Well-known Georgian poet Vazha Pshavela described the warfare of the Khevsurs in his poems. One of the most famous of these is Aluda Ketelauri, the eponymous hero of which is a Khevsur youth, famous for his bravery and warrior skills. One day, after the Khevsur village of Shatili, where he lived, had been invaded by the Kists (historical name for the Nakh peoples), Aluda followed the invaders and killed both of the robbers. However, after killing the 'Kist' called Mussah, Aluda began to weep, mourning for the warrior, in recognition of his bravery and dedication to his Muslim faith. When Aluda returned to Shatili he confessed to the villagers his admiration for the 'Kist' hero who had proved such a worthy adversary, but they were shocked at this praising of a 'pagan' and ended by condemning Aluda and expelling him from the community.

The Encyclopædia Britannica reported in 1911 that many curious customs still prevailed among the Khevsurs, as for instance the imprisonment of the woman during childbirth in a lonely hut, round which the husband parades, firing off his musket at intervals. After delivery, food was surreptitiously brought to the mother, who was kept in her prison a month, after which the hut was burnt. One of the more striking features of the traditional cultures of Khevsureti was the premarital relationship known as sts’orproba (or ts'ats'loba as it is known in Pshavi). A young couple could lie together during the night with a sword placed between them. Sexual intercourse between the pair was strictly forbidden. Any man who breached this rule was condemned to death.

Even in recent past a place called Anatori ossuary was used by gravely sick Khevsurs: to save their families they used to set out to that place and meet their end in seclusion, keeping their kinfolk safe from the calamities of sweeping epidemic and mortal disease. The warlike character of Khevsurs influenced some historians to the point that they were inclined to relate this tribe of the Georgian highlanders to the Crusaders; but the decisive point, of course, was the presence of the images of the cross in the national attire of the Khevsurs. Along with their bellicose history and experience, they have also a custom of the opposite peaceful nature and ethics: if a young girl or a woman throws her kerchief between the fighting Khevsurs, it signals her order to stop the combat and the men always obey the lady’s interference. 

Dozens of fortifications, sanctuaries and churches are scattered across the province. Chief of these are the Khakhmati fortress, Akhieli fortress, Lebaiskari fortress, Mutso fortress, Shatili fortifications, Gudani Cross, and the Anatori Cross.

See also 
 Georgian people
 History of Georgia
 Culture of Georgia

References

Further reading
KURTSIKIDZE, Shorena & CHIKOVANI, Vakhtang, Ethnography and Folklore of the Georgia-Chechnya Border: Images, Customs, Myths & Folk Tales of the Peripheries, Munich: Lincom Europa, Volume 9 of LINCOM studies in anthropology. 2008 
 MAKALATIA, Sergi, Khevsureti, Komunistis Stamba, Tbilisi: 1935 (in Georgian)
 RADDE, Dr. Gustav, Die Chews'uren und ihr Land — ein monographischer Versuch untersucht im Sommer 1876, Cassel 1878 (in German)
 TEDORADZE, Dr. Giorgi, Five Years in Pshav-Khevsureti, Tbilisi: 1930 (in Georgian ხუთი წელი ფშავ-ხევსურეთში )(online at Batsav.com)

External links 

  All About Khevsureti / ყველაფერი ხევსურეთის შესახებ
  History of Georgian Mountain Regions
 Legends of Khevsureti
 Tours in the Caucasus
 Central Caucasian religious systems and social ideology... by Kevin Tuite and Paata Bukhrashvili
 Mountain regions of Georgia
 The country of Black Shields
 Expedition to Khevsureti (in Georgian)
Khevsureti Tours
 Short 1947 film doc containing footage of villagers & customs

Former provinces of Georgia (country)
Historical regions of Georgia (country)
North Caucasus